The Villa Zambonina is a historic villa in Verona, Italy. It was completed in 1706.

References

Villas in Veneto
Houses completed in 1706